Manastır Türküsü, also called Manastırın ortasında is a Turkish song, sometimes played on a saz, that is known for being a favorite of Mustafa Kemal Atatürks and played at gatherings he attended, where he and other guests would reportedly sing along with the musicians. Several Turkish recording artists have released versions of the song including Okan Murat Öztürk, and it was played by the Istanbul State Symphony Orchestra as part of their special Atatürk'ün Sevdiği Şarkılar (Songs Atatürk Loved) concert.

There is more than one version of the lyrics. One version begins:

References

Turkish songs